Dean Francis Zanuck (born August 11, 1972) is an American production executive and film producer.

Biography

Early life
He was born on August 11, 1972 in Los Angeles. His father was Richard D. Zanuck (1934–2012), a film producer, and his mother, Linda Melson Harrison, an actress. His paternal grandfather was Darryl F. Zanuck, film producer and 20th Century Fox co-founder; his paternal grandmother was silent actress Virginia Fox (1902–1982), Darryl Zanuck's wife for fifty-five years.

Career
Zanuck has been an executive at The Zanuck Company for twenty years. During his tenure, he expanded the company, adding two new divisions: Zanuck Independent, for the development and production of independent movies, and Zanuck Family Entertainment, dedicated to the development and production of family films and multi-platform content.

Personal life
In 2002 Zanuck married Marisa, a real estate agent who was featured on the reality TV series The Real Housewives of Beverly Hills in its third season, which aired in 2013. The Zanucks lived together in Beverly Hills, California, until their divorce in February 2016. They have one son, Jack, and a daughter, Darryl.

Filmography
He was a producer in all films unless otherwise noted.

Film

Miscellaneous crew

Thanks

Television

References

1972 births
Living people
Businesspeople from Los Angeles
People from Beverly Hills, California
Film producers from California
Harvard-Westlake School alumni